The 1977 Berlin Open, also known as the Berlin International Championships, was a men's tennis tournament staged in Berlin, West Germany that was part of the Grand Prix circuit and categorized as a One star event. The tournament was played on outdoor clay courts and was held from 13 June until 19 June 1977. It was the third edition of the tournament and first-seeded Paolo Bertolucci won the singles title.

Finals

Singles
 Paolo Bertolucci defeated  Jiří Hřebec 6–4, 5–7, 4–6, 6–2, 6–4
 It was Bertolucci's 3rd singles title of the year and the 6th and last of his career.

Doubles
 Hans Gildemeister /  Belus Prajoux and  Pavel Huťka /  Vladimír Zedník final not played, title shared

References

External links
 ITF tournament edition details

Berlin Open
Berlin Open
Berlin Open, 1977
Berlin Open